Bailey Bass (born June 18, 2003) is an American actress. She is known for her roles as Tsireya, a free diver, in Avatar: The Way of Water and Claudia in the television series Interview with the Vampire (both 2022).

Early life 
Bass was born in Nashville, Tennessee, but grew up in a "a predominantly Russian neighborhood" in Brooklyn, New York.

Career 
Bass's first acting role was a My Little Pony commercial when she was 5 and a half. In 2014 she appeared in the movie Moon and Sun. She starred in the BET original movie A Jenkins Family Christmas (2021), and another TV movie Psycho Sweet 16 (2022).

In 2017, Bass was cast as Tsireya, a young Na'vi girl who is a free diver from the Metkayina Clan, in James Cameron's  Avatar sequels. Early on, Tsireya was described as "the young Neytiri of the ocean", likely in reference to both their statuses as daughters of their respective clans' leaders. Bass is also set to reprise the role in two additional sequels to be released in 2024 and 2026.

Personal life 
Bass is biracial; her father is Black and her mother is Belarusian.

Filmography

Film

Television

See also 
 Belarusian Americans

References

External links 
 

Actresses from Nashville, Tennessee
Actresses from New York City
American film actresses
Living people
African-American actresses
African-American child actresses
American child actresses
American people of Belarusian descent
American television actresses
People from Brooklyn
2003 births